Bill Vickers (18 February 1904 – 25 August 1976) was an Australian rules footballer who played with Essendon in the Victorian Football League (VFL).

Notes

External links 
		

1904 births
1976 deaths
Australian rules footballers from Victoria (Australia)
Essendon Football Club players
Old Scotch Football Club players